Glomerilla is a genus of fungi in the family Verrucariaceae. A monotypic genus, it contains the single species Glomerilla subtilis.

References

Lichen genera
Monotypic Eurotiomycetes genera